Forda orientalis is a species of aphid. It is a pest of millets.

References

Eriosomatinae
Insect pests of millets